Bulgakov is a Russian surname. Notable people with the surname include:

 Anatoly Bulgakov (footballer, born 1944), Russian football coach and former player
 Anatoly Bulgakov (footballer, born 1979), Russian football player
Alexander Yakovlevich Bulgakov (1781–1863), Russian diplomat, senator, and postal administrator; son of Yakov
Dmitry Bulgakov (born 1954), Russian economist and military leader
Gediminid family of Princes Bulgakov
Genrikh Bulgakov (1929–2010), Soviet fencer
Konstantin Bulgakov (1782–1835), Russian diplomat, privy councillor, and postal administrator; son of Yakov
Mikhail Bulgakov (1891–1940), Russian novelist and playwright, most notably of The Master and Margarita
Macarius Bulgakov (1816–1882), bishop known as Metropolitan Macarius of Moscow and Kolomna
Nikolai Bulgakov (born 1960), Russian professional football coach and a former player
Sergei Bulgakov (1871–1944), Christian theologian, philosopher and economist
Valentin Bulgakov (1886–1966), Russian memorialist and biographer of Leo Tolstoy
Yakov Bulgakov (1743–1809), Russian diplomat; father of Alexander and Konstantin
Nadezhda Mikhailovna Bulgakova, Russian physicist
Yuri Bulgakov, 16th century Russian governor and diplomat

See also
Bulgakovo
3469 Bulgakov, an asteroid named after Mikhail Bulgakov

Russian-language surnames